Thermal Science  is a peer-reviewed open-access scientific journal orientated to the basic research results in the fields of physics and chemistry. The journal was founded in 1997 year by the former Yugoslav Society of Heat Transfer Engineers (today Society of Thermal Engineers of Serbia) and it is published by Vinča Institute of Nuclear Sciences. The language of journal in English and publishing frequency is five issues per year.
The specific goal of this journal is to acquaint international scientists about recent scientific results accomplished in Serbia particularly and the whole Southeast Europe, and as well, to give information to the scientific community from Southeast Europe about recent results from basic research and applied science in developed countries. 

The editor-in-chief is Vukman Bakić (Vinča Institute of Nuclear Sciences, Serbia) and Editor-In-Chief Emeritus is Prof Simeon Oka (University of Belgrade, Serbia).
 
Since beginning of 2021 year, authors need to pay article processing charges, and they retain unrestricted copyrights and publishing rights.

Abstracting and indexing
Since 2007 year, the journal is abstracted and indexed in Scopus, and the Science Citation Index Expanded. According to the Journal Citation Reports, the journal has a 2021 impact factor of 1.971.

References

External links

Engineering journals
Publications established in 1997
English-language journals
Creative Commons Attribution-licensed journals
5 times per year journals